Henry Lakin Simpson (1859 – April 3, 1881) was a United States Navy sailor and a recipient of the United States military's highest decoration, the Medal of Honor. He later attended the United States Naval Academy.

Born in London, England, in 1859, Simpson immigrated to the United States and joined the Navy from New York. On that day, he and another sailor, Ordinary Seaman John Millmore, rescued their shipmate Ordinary Seaman John W. Powers from drowning. For this action, both Simpson and Millmore were awarded the Medal of Honor seven years later, on October 18, 1884. Simpson's award was posthumous.

Simpson was accepted into the United States Naval Academy as an engineering student (then known as cadet-engineers). He was admitted to the class of 1882, but resigned his appointment on February 28, 1881, before graduating. 

On Apr. 3, 1881 at age 21  Simpson died of consumption on board the City of Savannah (a steam ship) and was buried at the Delaware County Society of the New Jerusalem Church Burial Ground in Upper Darby, Pennsylvania. In the 1970s all remains were removed and reinterred in a mass grave at Mt Zion Cemetery in Collingdale, Pennsylvania.

Medal of Honor citation
Simpson's official Medal of Honor citation reads:
For rescuing from drowning John W. Powers, ordinary seaman on board the U.S.S. Essex, at Monrovia, Liberia, 31 October 1877.

See also

List of Medal of Honor recipients during peacetime
List of United States Naval Academy alumni (Medal of Honor)

References

1859 births
1881 deaths
English emigrants to the United States
English-born Medal of Honor recipients
Non-combat recipients of the Medal of Honor
Sailors from London
United States Naval Academy alumni
United States Navy Medal of Honor recipients